The mixed team badminton event at the 2011 Summer Universiade was held from August 16 to August 18 at the Shenzhen Polytechnic Gym and the Badminton Hall of Longgang Sports Center in Shenzhen, China. The teams play in pools in a round robin preliminary round, and the top teams from each pool advances to the playoffs.

Medalists

Preliminary round

Group A

Group B

Group C

Group D

Playoffs

References
Preliminary Round Pools

Badminton at the 2011 Summer Universiade